Hozan Osman (born 16 May 2003) is a professional footballer who plays as a winger for the Dutch club De Graafschap. Born in the Netherlands, he plays for the Syria national team.

Career
Osman began playing youth football in his local Arnhem at the age of 4 with ESA Rijkerswoerd. He moved to the youth academy of De Graafschap in 2019. He was promoted to De Graafschap U21 side in 2022.

International career
Born in the Netherlands, Osman is of Syrian descent. He represented the Syria U20s for the 2022 WAFF U-23 Championship. He debuted with the senior Syria national team in a friendly game with Venezuela in November 2022.

References

External links
 

Living people
2003 births
Footballers from Arnhem
Syrian footballers
Syria international footballers
Syrian Kurdish people
Dutch footballers
Dutch people of Syrian descent
De Graafschap players
Association football wingers